Battle of Beledweyne may refer to:

Battle of Beledweyne (2006)
Battle of Beledweyne (2008)
Battle of Beledweyne (2010)
Battle of Beledweyne (2011)